Lahou-Kpandah (also spelled Lahou-Kpanda, also known as Ebobou) is a coastal village in southern Ivory Coast. It is in the sub-prefecture of Grand-Lahou, Grand-Lahou Department, Grands-Ponts Region, Lagunes District. The village is just east of the town of Grand-Lahou, at the eastern end of the peninsula. 

Lahou-Kpandah was a commune until March 2012, when it became one of 1126 communes nationwide that were abolished.

Notes

Former communes of Ivory Coast
Populated places in Lagunes District
Populated places in Grands-Ponts